Abid (also Romanized as ‘Abīd; also known as Āb Bīd, Abed, and Shahrak-e Āb Bīd) is a village in Sardasht Rural District, Sardasht District, Dezful County, Khuzestan Province, Iran. At the 2006 census, its population was 662, in 120 families.

References 

Populated places in Dezful County